KLDT may refer to:

 KLDT-LD, a defunct low-power television station (channel 25) formerly licensed to serve Lufkin, Texas, United States
 KAZD, a television station (channel 39, virtual 55) licensed to serve Lake Dallas, Texas, which held the call sign KLDT from 1997 to 2010